Relationship of Command is the third studio album by American post-hardcore band At the Drive-In, released on September 12, 2000. The album combines an aggressive edge with a melodic drive, harmonious, emotive vocals, and surreal lyrics. While it continues in the alternative style of At the Drive-In's previous albums, Relationship of Command is seen as a more well-rounded album than its predecessors. Initially received positively by critics, the album is now seen not only as one of the most influential post-hardcore albums of the 2000s, but also as one of the most accomplished recent works in the wider rock spectrum. Relationship of Command was voted twelfth out of 100 in the Albums of the Decade by NME, and the 37th most influential album of all time by Kerrang!.

Background and recording
Relationship of Command was recorded over a seven-week period starting on January 17, 2000, following a tour supporting Rage Against the Machine. The album was recorded at the Indigo Ranch Studios, in Malibu, California, and was produced by Ross Robinson and mixed by Andy Wallace. Known for his unorthodox production methods, Robinson at one point took bass player Paul Hinojos for a drive in his SUV through the hills of Malibu to get his adrenaline going prior to recording. He also brought Iggy Pop to the studio for a guest appearance; Omar Rodriguez commented: "[Ross] had been talking to Iggy because they were gonna work together. I don't know if they ever did, but they'd sort of been chatting, so Ross had passed him our previous records and he liked them. So, of course I brought up the idea, "Why not [have Iggy] come and do something on the album?" Ross mentioned it to Iggy, and he was completely open to it. He came down to the studio for a whole day in which he sang [on "Rolodex Propaganda"] and did the ransom note [on "Enfilade"]."

The album's cover artwork (including the covers for the singles "One Armed Scissor," "Invalid Litter Dept." and "Rolodex Propaganda"), illustrated by Damon Locks, all revolve around imagery of the Trojan War, and the Trojan Horse in particular.

Release
In March 2000, the band embarked on a five-week tour of Europe, two of which were spent with Sunshine. Following this, the band played a few shows in Japan in May, with Eastern Youth. They returned to the US, in time for a July tour. "One Armed Scissor" was released as a single in August 2000. Relationship of Command was released on September 12, 2000. In March 2001, the band went on indefinite hiatus.

Reception

Critical reception

The album initially received generally positive reviews, with Metacritic giving the album an aggregate score of 77. The album is now seen as one of the most influential rock albums of the decade, with it being ranked 47th in the 50 Greatest Albums of the 21st century in Kerrang!, number 83 on Spin magazine's 100 Greatest Albums 1985–2005, 6th in State magazine's 100 albums of the decade, 3rd in JustPressPlay's Top 100 Albums of the 2000s, 52nd in Decibel magazine's Greatest 100 albums of the decade, 117th in Uncut magazine's 150 Albums of the decade, as well as being ranked at number 90 on MTV2's greatest albums ever list. A retrospective BBC music review hailed the significance of Relationship of Command's uniqueness, calling the album "mesmerising" and a "statement of grand intent that could never be followed."

In 2005, the album was ranked number 423 in Rock Hard magazine's book The 500 Greatest Rock & Metal Albums of All Time. The album is also seen as an influential guitar album, being ranked number 94 in a Guitar World reader's poll of the 100 greatest guitar albums of all time. This list appeared in the October 2006 issue of Guitar World.

Legacy
Following the release of the album, At the Drive-In gained brief mainstream critical and commercial success, with Relationship of Command appearing in end-of-year lists of the best albums of 2000 by publications such as the Los Angeles Times and Rolling Stone, as well as becoming their first album to reach the Billboard 200. The band also made appearances on shows such as Late Night with Conan O'Brien and the Late Show with David Letterman. However, despite this success, the band went on an indefinite hiatus in 2001, with the members splitting to form The Mars Volta and Sparta.

In an interview with Alternative Press in September 2010 (in an article praising the album 10 years later) when asked "What's your least favorite thing about the album?" Rodriguez replied: "In a heartbeat I could tell you, one of my only regrets out of everything I've ever done is the way that record was mixed. People think that was a raw and energetic record, but what they're hearing is nothing compared to what it truly was before it was glossed over and sent through the mixing mill that was Andy Wallace, who is a wonderful person and a very talented mixing engineer and has done great albums – I'm not trying to offend him....and I understand he had the pressure of the label and all the people who had dreams of it being this grandiose thing, and being played on the radio, which it was, (but) that record is ruined by the mix.  I just find it the most passive, plastic....It's the one record I still to this day cannot listen to." The album was included in Rock Sounds 101 Modern Classics list at number 4. The album was ranked at number 177 on Spins "The 300 Best Albums of the Past 30 Years (1985–2014)" list. In 2019, the album was ranked 42nd on The Guardians 100 Best Albums of the 21st Century list. In 2020, it was named one of the 20 best metal albums of 2000 by Metal Hammer magazine. Journalists Leslie Simon and Trevor Kelley included the album in their list of the most essential emo releases in their book Everybody Hurts: An Essential Guide to Emo Culture (2007). Alternative Press ranked "One Armed Scissor" at number one on their list of the best 100 singles from the 2000s.

Track listing

PersonnelAt the Drive-InCedric Bixler – lead vocals, guitar on "Rolodex Propaganda", melodica on "Enfilade", percussion
Jim Ward – guitar, vocals, keyboards
Omar Rodríguez – guitar, backing vocals
Paul Hinojos – bass
Tony Hajjar – drumsOther musiciansIggy Pop – guest vocals on "Rolodex Propaganda" and "Enfilade"
Ross Robinson – producer
Chuck Johnson – engineer
Zak Girdis – assistant engineer
Kevin Bosley – assistant engineer
Andy Wallace – mixing
Eddy Schreyer – mastering
Damon Locks – illustrations
Jason Farrell – layout design

Charts

Certifications

ReferencesCitationsSources'

 

At the Drive-In albums
2000 albums
Albums produced by Ross Robinson
Fearless Records albums
Grand Royal albums